Arguello is a comune (municipality) in the Province of Cuneo in the Italian region Piedmont, located about  southeast of Turin and about  northeast of Cuneo.

Arguello borders the following municipalities: Albaretto della Torre, Cerreto Langhe, Cravanzana, and Lequio Berria.

Demographic evolution

References

Cities and towns in Piedmont
Articles which contain graphical timelines